Gastridium is a genus of plants in the grass family. Species of the genus are found in Africa and Eurasia.<ref>Palisot de Beauvois, Ambroise Marie François Joseph . 1812.  Essai d'une Nouvelle Agrostographie plate  VI (6), figure VI (6 a-e) at upper right line drawings of Gastridium australe (syn of G. ventricosum ); figure captions on caption page 6</ref> These grasses are sometimes called nit grass.

 Species
The following species are recognised in the genus Gastridium:
 Gastridium lainzii (Romero García) Romero Zarco - south-western Spain
 Gastridium phleoides (Nees & Meyen) C.E.Hubb. - Africa, southern Europe, Middle East, Arabian Peninsula
 Gastridium scabrum C.Presl - Mediterranean region
 Gastridium ventricosum (Gouan) Schinz & Thell - Mediterranean and nearby regions from Great Britain to Cape Verde to Caucasus

 Formerly included
see Triplachne 
 Gastridium littorale - Triplachne nitens  
 Gastridium nitens - Triplachne nitens  
 Gastridium triaristatum - Triplachne nitens''

References

External links
 Jepson Manual Treatment
 Grass Manual Account

Pooideae
Poaceae genera